HSwMS Neptun is the second of three s, built to operate in the Baltic. Neptun entered service in December 1980. The next year she was involved an international incident when the Soviet submarine U 137 ran aground outside Karlskrona.

The Näcken class were among the first Swedish submarines to have onboard computers. Her task in the eventuality of war would have been to attack enemy shipping and surveillance duties.

Neptun was decommissioned in 1998 and laid up in Karlskrona. In 2008 she was  donated to the  Naval Museum Marinmuseum of Karlskrona, Sweden, where she is after restoration on display since 2014.

Gallery

References

Further reading 
 

Näcken-class submarines
Ships built in Malmö
Museum ships in Sweden
1979 ships